Fuglesang (also spelled Fugelsang) is a surname. Notable people with the surname include:

 Christer Fuglesang (born 1957), Swedish astronaut and physicist
 John Fugelsang (born 1969), American actor and stand-up comedian
 Nils Fuglesang (1918–1944), Norwegian military officer
 Rolf Jørgen Fuglesang (1909–1988), Norwegian politician 
 Signe Horn Fuglesang (born 1938), Norwegian art historian

See also
 Fuglsang (disambiguation)